During the 1963–64 season Hearts competed in the Scottish First Division, the Scottish Cup, the Scottish League Cup, the Inter-Cities Fairs Cup, the Summer Cup and the East of Scotland Shield.

Fixtures

Friendlies

East of Scotland Shield

Inter-Cities Fairs Cup

League Cup

Scottish Cup

Summer Cup

Scottish First Division

See also 
List of Heart of Midlothian F.C. seasons

References 

Statistical Record 63-64

External links 
Official Club website

Heart of Midlothian F.C. seasons
Heart of Midlothian